The Happy Ghost (Italian: L'allegro fantasma) is a 1941 Italian "white-telephones" comedy film directed by Amleto Palermi and starring Totò, Luigi Pavese and Franco Coop.

It was shot at the Cinecittà studios in Rome. The film's art direction was by Gastone Medin.

Plot 
The noble Pantaleo Santa Paola dies suddenly, without writing a will. Immediately in the villa go his three grandchildren and three other relatives. All claim family assets, and at the end of the story reaches the poor Nicolino, who is also the nephew of Pantaleo. The Pantaleo ghost appears while the dispute rages and declares his true heir.

Cast
 Totò as Nicolino & Gelsomino & Antonino  
 Luigi Pavese as Temistocle  
 Franco Coop as Maurizio Devalier  
 Isa Bellini as Rosa  
 Wilma Mangini as Titti 
 Thea Prandi  as Lilli  
 Paolo Stoppa as Gigetto  
 Amelia Chellini as Zia Lia  
 Dina Perbellini as Zia Giovanna  
 Elli Parvo as Erika  
 Claudio Ermelli as Battista  
 Augusto Di Giovanni as Asdrubale  
 Livia Minelli as Lina, la cameriera  
 Giulio Donadio as Il brigadiere  
 Lydia Johnson as Una signora  
 Mario Giannini as Il giovane biondo  
 Gioia Collei as La ragazzina  
 Rio Nobile
 Egilda Cecchini
 Lucy D'Albert as Una soubrette  
 Emilio Petacci as Anatolio, il maggiordomo di Devalier

References

Bibliography
 Aprà, Adriano. The Fabulous Thirties: Italian cinema 1929-1944. Electa International, 1979.

External links

1941 films
1941 comedy films
Italian comedy films
1940s Italian-language films
Films directed by Amleto Palermi
Films shot at Cinecittà Studios
Italian black-and-white films
1940s Italian films